The 1991 Bausch & Lomb Championships was a women's tennis tournament played on outdoor clay courts at the Amelia Island Plantation on Amelia Island, Florida in the United States that was part of Tier II of the 1991 WTA Tour. It was the 12th edition of the tournament and was held from April 8 through April 14, 1991. Gabriela Sabatini won the singles title.

Finals

Singles
 Gabriela Sabatini defeated  Steffi Graf 7–5, 7–6(7–3)
 It was Sabatini's 4th title of the year and the 19th of her career.

Doubles
 Arantxa Sánchez Vicario /  Helena Suková defeated  Mercedes Paz /  Natasha Zvereva 4–6, 6–2, 6–2
 It was Sánchez Vicario's 2nd title of the year and the 7th of her career. It was Suková's 3rd title of the year and the 44th of her career.

External links
 ITF tournament edition details

Bausch and Lomb Championships
Amelia Island Championships
Bausch & Lomb Championships
Bausch & Lomb Championships
Bausch & Lomb Championships